Coleophora is a very large genus of moths of the family Coleophoridae. It contains some 1,350 described species. The genus is represented on all continents, but the majority are found in the Nearctic and Palaearctic regions. Many authors have tried splitting the genus into numerous smaller ones, but most of these have not become widely accepted.

As with most members of the family, the larvae initially feed on the seeds, flowers or leaves of the host plant, but when larger, they feed externally and construct distinctive protective silken cases, often incorporating plant material. Many species have specific host plants; discarded larval cases are often scattered thickly on affected plants.

Technical description
For terms see External morphology of Lepidoptera
Antennae 4/5, porrected in repose, often thickened with scales towards base, in male  simple, basal joint long, usually with rough scales or projecting tuft. Labial palpi rather long, recurved, second joint more or less roughscaled or tufted towards apex beneath, terminal shorter, acute. Posterior tibiae rough - haired. Forewings with costa often long - haired beneath ; lb furcate, 4 sometimes absent, 5 absent, 6 and 7 connate or stalked, 7 to costa, 8 absent. Hindwings 2/3, linear-lanceolate, cilia 3-4 ; transverse veins sometimes partly absent, 4 usually absent, 6 and 7 closely approximated or stalked.

Gallery

Synonyms

References

External links

Fauna Europaea 
Nomina Insecta Nearctica
HOSTS - Caterpillar Hostplants Database
Coleophora at Markku Savela's Lepidoptera pages

 
Moth genera
Taxa named by Jacob Hübner